La Libertad, California is a former settlement in Fresno County, California that was 1/2 mile south and 5 miles east of Burrel, California. It was an early Mexican settlement in San Joaquin Valley, on the eastern route of El Camino Viejo that existed there at least until 1870.

References

Former settlements in Fresno County, California
Former populated places in California
San Joaquin Valley